Marinobacter lipolyticus is a moderate halophile with lipolytic activity. It is Gram-negative and rod-shaped, with type strain SM19T (=DSM 15157T =NCIMB 13907T =CIP 107627T =CCM 7048T).

Genome
The genome of Marinobacter lipolyticius is thought to be 4Mb with a 57.0% G+C content, and 3,646 putatative ORFs.

References

Further reading

External links

LPSN
Type strain of Marinobacter lipolyticus at BacDive -  the Bacterial Diversity Metadatabase

Alteromonadales
Bacteria described in 2003
Halophiles